The Laundress may refer to:

 The Laundress (Chardin), a painting
 The Laundress (Daumier), a painting
 The Laundress (Greuze), a painting
 The Laundress (Toulouse-Lautrec), a painting
 Laundress, another word for a washerwoman, i.e. someone whose occupation is doing laundry

See also

 The Launderettes, Norwegian rock band
 Launderette (disambiguation)
 Washerwoman (disambiguation)